Arnaud Binard (born 18 January 1971 in Bordeaux) is a French actor and producer mainly known for his roles in many romantic or detective television hit-series broadcast throughout the French-speaking world such as Sous Le Soleil (1998-1999), France 2's Groupe Flag (2002-2004), TF1's Alice Nevers: The judge is a woman (2002-2007), France 2's Empreintes criminelles (2011), Chérif (2015-2017) or France 3's Agathe Koltès (2016-2019). His feature films include Gabriel Axel's Leïla (2001) or the erotic dramas Grande École (2004) based on Jean-Marie Besset's The Best of Schools or Jean-Claude Brisseau's À l'aventure (2009). Within the English-speaking world, Binnard appeared in Hulu's Guidestones, ABC's Modern Family and plays Laurent in Emily in Paris.

Early life 
Binard grew up in the seaside resort of Seignosse-le-Penon where his parents, sports teachers, managed the old public seawater pools. Passionate about surfing, he declared:“As a teenager, the waves were an obsession. I dreamt of it every night. I saw surfers in my village as living gods. My parents had taught me very early on how to swim into the waves, but my father refused to see me practicing this 'smoky backpacker sport'. He eventually gave in, but we had already moved to Lot-et-Garonne, far from the coast. The frustration was intense." Sud-Ouest, July 2017.

Education 
At Marmande High School, Binard volunteered to form a theater group responding to the literature teacher's request to try to "conjure [his] great shyness". He started in the theater at the age of fourteen and for several years explored different facets of acting: "the pleasure of acting never left me." He continued his theatrical journey in Bordeaux, where he also began studying to become a physical education teacher. From the classical repertoire to street theater via improvisation, he extended his career by moving to Paris in 1996 to take the Jean Darnel course at the Théâtre de l'Atelier and began his career on stage in the mid-1980s.

Career 
He has been working for several years for television (Le Dernier Seigneur des Balkans, Alice Nevers, Le Ciel sur la tête, Empreintes criminelles...) and cinema (À l'aventure, ID:A).

In 2014, he portrayed the character of Brooklyn Cott on series Guidestones (season 2).

In Novembre 2014, he founded broadcasting production company Atelier K-plan which is based in Bordeaux.

Since 2016, he plays the role of Captain Fontaine on TV Series Agathe Koltès (France 3).

Filmography

Producer

References

External links 
 

1971 births
Living people
20th-century French male actors
21st-century French male actors
Male actors from Bordeaux
Mass media people from Bordeaux
French male film actors
French male television actors